The Govan-Partick Bridge is a proposed bridge in Glasgow, Scotland, across the River Clyde, close to the Riverside Museum.

The 110-metre bridge will carry pedestrians and bicycles between Govan south of the river and Partick to the north. The V-shaped pylon design is inspired by the historic cranes at the riverside. It will be one of the largest opening footbridges in Europe.

The work is intended to improve the economic conditions in Govan (which is a deprived area of the city) and is linked to the Glasgow University and Glasgow City Council-led 'West End Innovation Quarter'. The bridge will land at Water Row in Govan where a mixed use development of housing and commercial space is planned.

History 
Funded through City Deal, the Glasgow City Council led project was expected to start in 2020, with the bridge to open in summer 2021. In February 2020, the final plans for the bridge were revealed with an updated opening year of 2022. Construction is now expected to begin in January 2022 with the bridge opening towards the end of 2023.

References

Proposed bridges in the United Kingdom
Bridges in Glasgow
Transport in Glasgow
Bridges across the River Clyde
Govan
Partick